Dirsekli is a village in the Cizre District of Şırnak Province in Turkey. The village is populated by Kurds of the Botikan tribe and had a population of 6,090 in 2021.

The hamlets of Dallı, Güzeller and Yamaç are attached to Dirsekli.

Dirsekli was the most populous village in Turkey in 2021.

References 

Villages in Cizre District
Kurdish settlements in Şırnak Province